Athletics competitions have been held at the quadrennial Bolivarian Games since the inaugural edition 1938 in Bogotá, Colombia.  A detailed history of the early editions of the Bolivarian Games between 1938 and 1989 including extensive lists of participating athletes and officials from Bolivia was published in a book written (in Spanish) by José Gamarra Zorrilla, former president of the Bolivian Olympic Committee, and first president (1976-1982) of ODESUR.

Editions

Medals

Medal winners for the athletics events of the Bolivarian Games from 1938 to 2005 were published.

See also
List of Bolivarian Games records in athletics

External links
Athletics medallists from 1938–2005 Bolivarian Games

References

 
Bolivarian Games
Sports at the Bolivarian Games
Athletics in South America